Fremantle Football Club's drafting and trading history is often cited as a reason for their poor on-field record; the club took eight years to reach a final, and won their first final in 2006.  In recent years, however, they have been successful in finding good players with late round and rookie list selections.

Phil Smart was the recruiting manager at Fremantle from when they were formed in 1994 until 2008, remaining at the club until the end of 2009 as their draft manager, with Brad Lloyd being appointed the national recruitment manager.  Smart was the Claremont Football Club colts (under 19) coach in 1994, and wasn't appointed until near the end of the 1994 WAFL season on 1 September 1994, just 2 months before the team started training.  He had also never seen a game outside WA, something that would factor in the trade of future Australian Football Hall of Fame inductee Andrew McLeod to Adelaide, considered one of the worst trades the Dockers have ever made.

1994/95 off season
Fremantle's initial squad of 50 players was compiled from a mixture of uncontracted players from other AFL clubs (maximum of 12 over two years), players who had previously nominated for the AFL draft but not been selected (unlimited from the WAFL, two each from the SANFL, VFL and TFL), up to ten delisted AFL players, trades with any other AFL club, unlimited selections from their four "aligned" WAFL clubs and selections 1, 4 and then the first two selections in each round of the 1994 AFL draft.

The McLeod trade
Fremantle had flown the 18-year-old McLeod and his father to Perth for an interview, but none of the coaching or recruiting staff had actually seen him play, despite McLeod having played in a premiership for Port Adelaide Football Club in the South Australian National Football League (SANFL) a few weeks earlier.

McLeod was puzzled and insulted when Fremantle coach Gerard Neesham asked him to stand up to see how tall he was. The result of this short meeting was that he was traded to Adelaide in return for promising centre half-forward Chris Groom, who they also hadn't see play.  McLeod went on to play over 300 games, whilst Groom played only seven for Fremantle before being delisted at the end of the 1995 season.

Fremantle made similar trades with Melbourne to obtain Phil Gilbert and North Melbourne to obtain Troy Polak, trading away Jeff Farmer and Glenn Freeborn respectively.

Uncontracted players

Attracting uncontracted players from other AFL clubs would prove to be very difficult, except for some West Australian players willing to move back to Perth. The AFL also awarded compensation selections to any club that lost a player to Fremantle, of a 16-year-old player, which had the effect of reducing the available talent in the following year's draft, with Fremantle the only club who would be unable to recruit these 16-year-old players.

Prior to the 1994 draft, Fremantle arranged a deal with Essendon where they would recruit three players, all originally from Western Australia, and agree not to recruit any uncontracted players from any team that finished below Essendon in 1994.  This would ensure that Essendon would have the first choice of the 16-year-olds in the compensation draft.  Officially Todd Ridley was recruited as the uncontracted player, with Tony Delaney and Dale Kickett being traded for later picks.  Whilst Kickett had a long and distinguished career at Fremantle, becoming the first player to play 100 games for the club and winning the Doig Medal in 1997, Delaney and Ridley weren't as successful. Essendon, however, recruited Matthew Lloyd with the 16-year-old compensation selection and Scott Lucas with the 4th selection, who would each play 270 games and kick a combined total of 1397 goals.

Fremantle also recruited its inaugural captain, Ben Allan and three of their first four best and fairest award winners, Peter Mann, Stephen O'Reilly and Jason Norrish through the uncontracted player process.  Only one of the uncontracted players recruited, Andrew Wills, was not originally from Western Australia.  In contrast to the outstanding career of Lloyd, the careers of the other compensation selections was mixed.  Whilst West Coast's Chad Morrison and Geelong's Steven King had long and successful careers, and North Melbourne's Stuart Cochrane and Geelong's Adam Houlihan each played around 100 AFL games, Hawthorn's selection of David McEwan didn't play an AFL game and Melbourne's David Cockatoo-Collins only played two games.

Traded to Fremantle
 Dale Kickett (Essendon) for selection #39
 Tony Delaney (Essendon) for selection #4
 Phil Gilbert (Melbourne) for Jeff Farmer
 Chris Groom (Adelaide) for Andrew McLeod
 Scott Watters (Sydney) for selection #21
 Troy Polak (North Melbourne) for Glenn Freeborn and selection #55
 Pick 42 for Darryl Wakelin (St Kilda)

1994 National draft:
1: Jeff White (Southern U18)
22: Winston Abraham (Perth)
42: Douglas Headland (Perth)
56: Ryan Smith (West Perth)
72: Dean Grainger (Northern U18)
73: Sam McFarlane (Subiaco)

Pre-season draft:
2: Greg Madigan (Hawthorn)

Pre-draft selections:
 Daniel Bandy (Perth)
 Jay Burton (Subiaco)
 Brad Cassidy (Ballarat Rebels)
 Antony Ljubic (Gippsland Power)
 Neil Mildenhall (West Perth)
 Peter Miller (East Perth)
 Nathan Mourish (Perth)
 David Muir (North Melbourne)
 Craig Nettelbeck (Sydney)
 Shane Parker (Subiaco)
 Luke Toia (Subiaco)

Foundation Selections
 Peter Bell (South Fremantle)
 Craig Burrows (East Fremantle)
 Matthew Burton (Subiaco)
 Craig Callaghan (Swan Districts)
 Darren Capewell (East Fremantle)
 Scott Chisholm (Claremont)
 Gary Dhurrkay (East Fremantle)
 Scott Edwards (Claremont)
 Mark Gale (Claremont)
 Scott Gooch (Subiaco)
 Anthony Jones (Claremont)
 Quenton Leach (Claremont)
 Andrew McGovern (Claremont)
 Shaun McManus (East Fremantle)
 Jamie Merillo (Claremont)
 Brendon Retzlaff (Swan Districts)
 Leigh Wardell-Johnson (Claremont)
 Brad Wira (Claremont)

Zone selections:
 Travis Edmonds (Swan Districts)
 Kingsley Hunter (Claremont)
 John Hutton (Claremont)
 Todd Menegola(Swan Districts)
 Clinton Wolf (Claremont)

Uncontracted player selections:
 Todd Ridley (Essendon): compensation selection - Matthew Lloyd
 Ben Allan (Hawthorn): compensation selection - David McEwan
 Jason Norrish (Melbourne): compensation selection - David Cockatoo-Collins
 Peter Mann (North Melbourne): compensation selection - Stuart Cochrane
 Andrew Wills (Geelong): compensation selection - Adam Houlihan
 Brendan Krummel (West Coast): compensation selection - Chad Morrison
 Stephen O'Reilly (Geelong): compensation selection - Steven King

Delisted before season started:
 Dean Grainger
 Douglas Headland
 Sam McFarlane
 Troy Polak

1995/96 off season

Traded to Fremantle
 David Hynes (West Coast) for Phillip Matera and selection #3
1995 National draft:
1: Clive Waterhouse (Port Adelaide)
7: Ben Edwards (Claremont)
13: Brad Rowe (Collingwood)
23: Jay Burton (redrafted)
Pre-draft selection:
 Daniel Parker (Subiaco)
Zone selections:
 James Clement (South Fremantle)
 Steven Koops (West Perth)
 Trent Carroll (Claremont)
 Greg Harding (Claremont)
 Gavin Mitchell (Claremont)
 Michael Brown (Swan Districts)
 Michael Clark (Swan Districts)
 Brendon Feddema (East Fremantle)
 Martin Whitelaw (West Perth)
Pre-season draft (uncontracted player selection):
 Tony Godden (West Coast): compensation selection: David Wirrpanda

Delisted
 Peter Bell
 Jay Burton (was delisted and then redrafted in the national draft)
 Darren Capewell
 Brad Cassidy
 Travis Edmonds
 Ben Edwards (was drafted and then delisted in the same off-season)
 Chris Groom
 John Hutton
 Brendan Krummel
 Antony Ljubic
 Todd Menegola
 Neil Mildenhall
 Peter Miller
 Nathan Mourish
 Craig Nettelbeck
 Brendon Retzlaff
 Ryan Smith
 Leigh Wardell-Johnson
 Clinton Wolf
Traded Away
 Brad Wira for selection #13

1996/97 off season

1996 National draft:
12: Heath Black (Oakleigh Chargers)
31: Jess Sinclair (Eastern Ranges)
46: Matthew Clucas (East Fremantle)
Rookie draft:
4: Cameron Venables (Subiaco)
19: Matthew Richter (Claremont)
34: Rupert Betheras (East Perth)
49: Scott Gooch (redrafted)
64: Gavin Milentis (Claremont)

Retired
 Scott Edwards
Delisted:
 Phil Gilbert
 Todd Ridley
 Brad Rowe
 David Muir
 Jay Burton
 Scott Gooch (was redrafted in the rookie draft)

1997/98 off season

Traded to Fremantle
 Adrian Fletcher (Brisbane Lions) with selection #26 for selection #5
 Daniel Hargraves (Western Bulldogs) for selection #18
 Stuart Anderson (Kangaroos) for Winston Abraham
 Chris Bond (Richmond) with selection #5 for selection #2
1997 National draft:
6: James Walker (North Ballarat Rebels)
21: Clem Michael (South Fremantle)
26: Brodie Holland (Tassie Mariners)
32: Troy Johnson (South Fremantle)
Rookie draft:
5: Brad Dodd (East Fremantle)
21: Paul Maher (Perth)
37: Cameron Jackson (Central U18)
53: John Neesham (East Fremantle)

Retired
 Ben Allan
 Scott Watters
 Greg Madigan
Delisted
 Craig Burrows
 David Hynes
 Jamie Merillo
 Rupert Betheras (rookie)
 Gavin Milentis (rookie)
 Matthew Richter (rookie)
 Cameron Venables (rookie)
Traded Away
 Gavin Mitchell to St Kilda for selection #32
 Jeff White to Melbourne for selection #21
 Winston Abraham to Kangaroos for Stuart Anderson

1998/99 off season

Traded to Fremantle
 Tony Modra (Adelaide) for selections #29 and #34
 Brad Wira (Western Bulldogs) for Kingsley Hunter
1998 National draft:
2: Justin Longmuir (West Perth)
18: Daniel Schell (Central District)
49: Garth Taylor (Swan Districts)
64: Andrew Shipp (Springvale)
Pre-season draft:
2: Ashley Prescott (Richmond)
Rookie draft:
2: Darren Bolton (Peel Thunder)
17: Ashley Clancy (Subiaco)
31: Antoni Grover (Subiaco)
45: Andrew Smith (Subiaco)
Rookie Elevation:
 Brad Dodd
 Paul Maher

Delisted
 Gary Dhurrkay
 Tony Godden
 Quenton Leach
 Brendon Feddema
 Cameron Jackson (rookie)
 Martin Whitelaw
 Troy Johnson
 John Neesham (rookie)
Traded Away
 Kingsley Hunter to Western Bulldogs for Brad Wira
 Scott Chisholm to Melbourne for selection #29

1999/2000 off season

Traded to Fremantle
 Troy Cook (Sydney) for selection #34
 Brendon Fewster (West Coast) for selection #16
 Troy Longmuir (Melbourne) for selections #19 and #63
1999 National draft:
2: Paul Hasleby (East Fremantle)
4: Matthew Pavlich (Woodville-West Torrens)
5: Leigh Brown (Gippsland Power)
46: Adam Butler (Murray Bushrangers)
49: Ben Cunningham (Claremont)
Pre-season draft:
2: Brad Bootsma (South Fremantle)
Rookie draft:
2: Nathan Carroll (Claremont)
18: Robbie Haddrill (Perth)
34: Luke Newick (Subiaco)
49: Dale Walkingshaw (Peel Thunder)
Rookie Elevation:
 Darren Bolton
 Antoni Grover
 Ashley Clancy

Retired
 Chris Bond (retired after he was delisted)
 Stuart Anderson
 Andrew McGovern
 Peter Mann
Delisted
 Matthew Burton
 Andrew Wills
 Daniel Parker
 Daniel Hargraves
 Tony Delaney
 Michael Brown
 Darren Bolton
 Michael Clark
Traded Away
 Stephen O'Reilly for selections #16 and #46

2000/01 off season

Traded to Fremantle
 Peter Bell (North Melbourne) for Jess Sinclair and selections #6, 8 & 37
 Matthew Carr (St Kilda) for Craig Callaghan
 Daniel Metropolis (West Coast) for Greg Harding
 Dwayne Simpson (Sydney) for selection #52
2000 National draft:
39: Adam McPhee (Dandenong Stingrays)
51: Dion Woods (Perth)
66: Scott Thornton (Sandringham Dragons)
Pre-season draft:
4: Simon Eastaugh (Essendon)
Rookie draft:
5: Keren Ugle (South Fremantle)
21: Roger Hayden (South Fremantle)
36: Daniel Haines (Peel Thunder)
49: Andrew Siegert (Geelong)
Rookie elevation:
 None

Delisted
 Mark Gale
 Paul Maher
 Matthew Clucas
 Trent Carroll
 Dale Walkingshaw
 Garth Taylor
 Luke Newick
 Nathan Carroll
 Andrew Smith
Traded Away
 Craig Callaghan for Matthew Carr
 James Clement with Holland for selections #8 and #39
 Brodie Holland with Clement for selections #8 and #39
 Greg Harding for Daniel Metropolis and selection #51
 Jess Sinclair with selection #6, #8 & #37 for Peter Bell

2001/02 off season

The Croad trade
After a disastrous 2001 season during which Fremantle sacked coach Damian Drum mid-year and only won 2 games, Fremantle then became only the second club to trade away the first selection in the national draft (after Sydney Swans in 1992), which it received in addition to selection 4 as a priority draft pick due to their poor performance. In what would end up being considered one of the strongest drafts ever, Fremantle traded its first three draft selections for Hawthorn's key forward Trent Croad, along with injury prone former East Fremantle junior Luke McPharlin.  Two of those selections were used by Hawthorn to draft four time premiership players and club captains Luke Hodge (#1 selection) and Sam Mitchell (#36).  Fremantle had not yet appointed a coach, so the recruitment was led by the chief executive officer (CEO) Cameron Schwab, who also had only recently been hired.

Schwab is quoted as saying that it didn't matter if they traded draft pick 1 or 4, they still would have drafted Western Australian key position player Graham Polak with their first selection, ahead of the three Victorian midfielders that were chosen in the actual draft, Hodge, Luke Ball and Chris Judd.  "It didn't matter whether we could take him (Polak) at No 1 or 4 — the issue was that we ranked the wrong player number one".  Part of the reason for choosing three tall players in Croad, McPharlin and Polak was that they were concerned that Matthew Pavlich could leave Fremantle to return to Adelaide the following year, and they had no other key position players in their squad.

Croad would only stay at Fremantle for two years, leading Fremantle's goalkicking in 2002, before being traded back to Hawthorn at the end of the 2003 season.  He then played mainly in defence for Hawthorn and was a key member of their 2008 AFL Grand Final winning team. Polak played over 100 games for Fremantle before he was traded to Richmond in 2006, whilst McPharlin has played over 200 games for Fremantle and was named in the 2012 All-Australian team.  Pavlich didn't return to Adelaide and remained at Fremantle to become the club's longest serving captain, games and goal scoring record holder, 6-time All-Australian and 6-time Doig Medalist and in 2014 became the first Western Australian based player to play over 300 AFL games.

Traded to Fremantle
 Trent Croad (Hawthorn) with McPharlin for selections #1, #20 and #36
 Luke McPharlin (Hawthorn) with Croad for selections #1, #20 and #36
 Jeff Farmer (Melbourne) for selection #17
 Troy Simmonds (Melbourne) for Daniel Bandy
2001 National draft:
4: Graham Polak (East Fremantle)
52: Andrew Browne (Claremont)
56: Paul Medhurst (Claremont)
Rookie Draft:
1: Luke Webster (East Perth)
17: Josh Head (South Fremantle)
33: Aaron Sandilands (East Fremantle)
Rookie Elevation:
 Daniel Haines
 Robbie Haddrill

Retired
 Tony Modra
 Ashley Prescott
Delisted
 Adam Butler
 Ashley Clancy
 Adrian Fletcher
 Dwayne Simpson
 Keren Ugle
 Brad Wira
Traded Away
 Daniel Bandy in a three-way trade with Troy Simmonds and Craig Ellis
 Heath Black for selection #17
 Daniel Schell for selection #56

2002/03 off season

Traded to Fremantle
 Des Headland (Brisbane Lions) for Adam McPhee, selections #3 & 19
2002 National draft:
13: Byron Schammer (West Adelaide)
48: Greg Edgcumbe (Eastern Ranges)
55: Ryan Crowley (Calder Cannons)
63: Brett Doswell (NSW/ACT Rams)
Rookie draft:
4: Ricky Mott (Sydney)
20: Ben Colreavy (Claremont)
35: Daniel Gilmore (South Fremantle)
51: Steven Dodd (East Fremantle)
Rookie elevation:
 Roger Hayden
 Andrew Siegert
 Aaron Sandilands

Retired
 Dale Kickett
 Jason Norrish
 Daniel Metropolis
 Clem Michael (retired November 2001)
 Simon Eastaugh
 Brad Bootsma
Delisted:
 Brendon Fewster
 Brad Dodd
 Andrew Shipp
Traded away:
 Leigh Brown for selection #13
 Adam McPhee for selection #55, Des Headland to Fremantle, Blake Caracella to Brisbane

2003/04 off season

2003 National draft:
10: Ryley Dunn (Murray Bushrangers)
12: Ryan Murphy (Gippsland Power)
19: David Mundy (Murray Bushrangers)
27: Adam Campbell (North Ballarat Rebels)
43: Brett Peake (East Fremantle, Father-son selection)
Rookie Draft
9: Paul Duffield (South Fremantle)
26: Dylan Smith (North Melbourne)
41: Michael Warren (Claremont)
55: Ben Colreavy (redrafted) 
Pre Season Draft
8: Michael Johnson (Perth)
Rookie Elevation:
 Daniel Gilmore
 Luke Webster

Delisted
 Ben Colreavy  (was redrafted in the rookie draft)
 Josh Head
 Anthony Jones
 Ricky Mott
 Luke Toia
Traded Away
 Trent Croad to Hawthorn for selection #10
 Steven Koops to Western Bulldogs for #19

2004/05 off season

Traded to Fremantle
 Josh Carr (Port Adelaide) for selections #11, #27 and # 45.
 Heath Black (St Kilda) three-way deal with Troy Simmonds and Aaron Fiora.
2004 National draft:
59: Benet Copping (Sturt)
67: Toby Stribling (North Adelaide)
69: Daniel Haines  (redrafted)
Pre-season draft:
5: Jarrad Schofield (Port Adelaide)
Rookie draft:
8: Joseph Krieger (Sandringham Dragons)
24: Jack Juniper (Glenelg)
39: Ryan Crowley (redrafted)
Rookie elevation:
 Steven Dodd
 Dylan Smith

Delisted:
 Ben Colreavy
 Ryan Crowley (was redrafted in the rookie draft)
 Ben Cunningham
 Brett Doswell
 Greg Edgcumbe
 Daniel Haines (was redrafted in the national draft)
 Clive Waterhouse
Traded away:
 Troy Simmonds to Richmond, three-way deal with Heath Black and Aaron Fiora.
 Troy Longmuir to Carlton for selection #67

2005/06 off season

2005 National draft:
10: Marcus Drum (Murray Bushrangers)
26: Garrick Ibbotson (East Fremantle)
42: Robert Warnock (Sandringham Dragons)
Rookie draft:
8: Paul Duffield (redrafted)
23: Toby Stribling (redrafted)
Rookie elevated:
 Ryan Crowley
 Michael Warren

Delisted: 
 Dion Woods
 Andrew Siegert
 Dylan Smith
 Toby Stribling (was redrafted in the rookie draft)
 Paul Duffield (was redrafted in the rookie draft)
Traded away:
 No trades

2006/07 off season

Traded to Fremantle
 Chris Tarrant (Collingwood) for Paul Medhurst and draft selection #8
 Dean Solomon (Essendon) plus draft selection #52 for draft selections #42 and #47

2006 National draft:
31: Clayton Collard (South Fremantle)
52: Brock O'Brien (Peel Thunder)
77: Calib Mourish (Towns Football Club, Geraldton)
Rookie draft:
13: Chris Smith (Mt Gravatt)
28: Andrew Foster (East Fremantle)
42: Darren Rumble (Subiaco)
52: Benet Copping (redrafted)
Rookie elevated:
 Paul Duffield

Retired
 Jarrad Schofield
Delisted: 
 Benet Copping (was redrafted in the rookie draft)
 Daniel Haines
 Jack Juniper
 Joseph Krieger
 Toby Stribling
 Michael Warren

Traded away:
 Graham Polak plus draft selections #13 and #63 for draft selections #8 and #42 from Richmond
 Paul Medhurst plus draft selection #8 for Chris Tarrant

2007/08 off season

Traded to Fremantle
 None
2007 National draft:
7: Rhys Palmer (East Fremantle)
24: Clayton Hinkley (North Ballarat Rebels)
40: Chris Mayne (Perth)
55: Mark Johnson (Essendon)
69: Kepler Bradley (Essendon)
Pre-season draft
6: Josh Head (South Fremantle)
Rookie draft:
6: Brent Connelly (Gippsland Power)
22: Luke Pratt (Swan Districts)
37: Calib Mourish (East Fremantle)
50: Ryley Dunn (East Fremantle)
Rookie elevated:
 Andrew Foster

Retired
 Troy Cook
 Shane Parker
 Justin Longmuir
Delisted: 
 Clayton Collard
 Benet Copping
 Ryley Dunn (was redrafted in the rookie draft)
 Robbie Haddrill
 Calib Mourish (was redrafted in the rookie draft)
 Darren Rumble
 James Walker
Traded away:
 None

2008/09 off season

Traded to Fremantle
 None
2008 National draft
3: Stephen Hill (West Perth)
21: Hayden Ballantyne (Peel Thunder)
24: Nick Suban (North Ballarat Rebels)
37: Zac Clarke (Oakleigh Chargers)
53: Michael Walters (Swan Districts)
56: Ben Bucovaz (Geelong Falcons)
68: Tim Ruffles (North Ballarat Rebels)
77: Chris Hall (Woodville West Torrens)
Pre-season draft
 None
Rookie draft:
3: Casey Sibosado (Oakleigh Chargers)
19: Matt de Boer (Claremont)
34: Hamish Shepheard (East Perth)
48: Clancee Pearce (Swan Districts)
62: Jay van Berlo (West Perth)
74: Greg Broughton (Subiaco)

Rookie elevated:
 None

Retired
Peter Bell
Heath Black
Matthew Carr
Jeff Farmer
Mark Johnson
Shaun McManus
Luke Webster

Delisted: 
Josh Carr
 Ryley Dunn (rookie)
 Chris Smith(rookie)
 Calib Mourish (rookie)
Traded away:
 Robert Warnock with selection 65 to Carlton for selections 24, 56 & 68

2009/10 off season

Traded to Fremantle
 None
2009 National draft:
4: Anthony Morabito (Peel Thunder)
20 Nathan Fyfe (Claremont)
36: Joel Houghton (Perth)
48: Jesse Crichton (North Launceston)
49: Dylan Roberton (Dandenong Stingrays)
52: Justin Bollenhagen (South Adelaide)
68: Pass
79: Greg Broughton (rookie elevation)
Pre-season draft
3: Adam McPhee (Essendon)
Rookie draft:
8: Michael Barlow (Werribee)
24: Alex Silvagni (Casey Scorpions)

Retired
Andrew Browne

Delisted: 
Adam Campbell
Andrew Foster
Daniel Gilmore
Josh Head
Luke Pratt (rookie)
Brent Connelly (rookie)

Traded away:
 Brett Peake (to St Kilda) for selection 48
 Marcus Drum (to Geelong) for selection 49

2010/11 off season

Traded to Fremantle
Peter Faulks (Williamstown) and pick #61 from Gold Coast for pick #56
Tendai Mzungu  (Perth) and pick #45 for pick #39
Jonathon Griffin (Adelaide) for pick #61

2010 National draft
20: Jayden Pitt (Geelong Falcons)
44: Viv Michie (Oakleigh Chargers)
56: Josh Mellington (Murray Bushrangers)
72: Pass
87: Michael Barlow (rookie elevation)
100: Matt de Boer (rookie elevation)
109: Alex Silvagni (rookie elevation)
112: Jay van Berlo (rookie elevation)

Pre-season draft
6: Jack Anthony

Rookie draft:
20: Gavin Roberts (Norwood)
37: Nick Lower (Norwood)
53: Ben Bucovaz (redrafted)
68: Tim Ruffles (redrafted)

Retired
Dean Solomon
Scott Thornton
Paul Hasleby
Des Headland

Delisted: 
Chris Hall
Ben Bucovaz (was redrafted in the rookie draft)
Tim Ruffles (was redrafted in the rookie draft)
Brock O'Brien
Steven Dodd
Ryan Murphy

Traded away:
Chris Tarrant  (to Collingwood) with pick #45 for #44 and #56

2011/12 off season

Traded to Fremantle
 Pick 20 for End of Round One Compensation Pick with Greater Western Sydney Giants
 Picks 29,58 & 71 for Picks 38 & 56 with Hawthorn

2011 National draft
16: Tom Sheridan (Calder Cannons)
20: Hayden Crozier (Eastern Ranges)
29: Alex Forster (Norwood)	
58: Lachie Neale (Glenelg)
71: Cameron Sutcliffe (Woodville-West Torrens)
83: Nick Lower, (rookie elevation)

Pre-season draft
10: Zac Dawson (St Kilda)

Rookie draft:
8: Lee Spurr (Central District)
26: Haiden Schloithe (South Fremantle)
44: Sam Menegola (Hawthorn)
61: Jordan Wilson-King (North Adelaide)
75: Clancee Pearce (redrafted)

Retired
Byron Schammer
Roger Hayden

Delisted: 
Clayton Hinkley
Joel Houghton
Ben Bucovaz
Tim Ruffles
Hamish Shepheard
Justin Bollenhagen
Clancee Pearce (was redrafted in the rookie draft)
Casey Sibosado

Uncontracted player
 Rhys Palmer to 

Traded away:
 Nil

2012/13 off season

Traded to Fremantle
Pick 36 for Greg Broughton and pick 58

Free agent recruits:
 Danyle Pearce (Port Adelaide)

2012 National draft
17: Josh Simpson (East Fremantle)
36: Tanner Smith (North Ballarat Rebels)
39: Max Duffy (East Fremantle)
78: Clancee Pearce (rookie elevation)
93: Lee Spurr (rookie elevation)

Pre-season draft
8: Jack Hannath (Central District)
14: Jesse Crichton (redrafted)

Rookie draft:
11: Matt Taberner (Murray Bushrangers)
25: Alex Howson (East Fremantle)

Category B Rookie selection
46: Craig Moller (NSW AFL Scholarship)
 

Retired
Antoni Grover
Adam McPhee
Delisted: 
Jay van Berlo
Dylan Roberton
Nick Lower
Jesse Crichton (redrafted)
Jack Anthony
Gavin Roberts
Jordan Wilson-King

Uncontracted players/Free agents
Nil

Traded away:
 Greg Broughton  (to Gold Coast) and Pick #58

2013/14 off season

Traded to Fremantle
Pick 58 for Viv Michie
Scott Gumbleton (Essendon) for pick 55

Free agent recruits:
Colin Sylvia (Melbourne)

2013 National draft
17: Michael Apeness (Eastern Ranges)
37: Alex Pearce (Ulverstone/Devonport)
58: Brady Grey (Burnie Dockers)
73: Matt Taberner (rookie elevation)

Pre-season draft
None

Rookie draft:
16: Michael Wood  (Subiaco)
32: Tom Vandeleur
47: Jacob Ballard (Northern Blues)

Retired
Jayden Pitt
Delisted: 
Jesse Crichton
Peter Faulks
Alex Forster
Alex Howson
Josh Mellington
Haiden Schloithe

Uncontracted players/Free agents lost
None

Traded away:
 Viv Michie (to Melbourne)
 Pick 55

2014/15 off season

Traded to Fremantle
None
Free agent recruits:
None
2014 National draft
13: Lachie Weller (Southport/Broadbeach)		
34: Connor Blakely	(Swan Districts)
54: Ed Langdon (Sandringham Dragons)
68: Josh Deluca (Subiaco)
Rookie elevation:
None
Pre-season draft
None
Rookie draft:
13:Ethan Hughes (Swan Districts)
31:Tanner Smith (redrafted)
48:Sean Hurley (Kildare GAA, Ireland)

Retired
Kepler Bradley
Scott Gumbleton
Delisted: 
Sam Menegola
Michael Wood
Josh Simpson
Tanner Smith (was redrafted in the rookie draft)
Uncontracted players/Free agents lost
None
Traded away:
None

2015/16 off season

Traded to Fremantle
Harley Bennell (Gold Coast) (with #22 & #61)
Free agent recruits
None
2015 National draft
27: Darcy Tucker (North Ballarat Rebels, TAC Cup)		
38: Harley Balic	(Sandringham Dragons, TAC Cup)
55: Sam Collins (VFL)
61: Shane Yarran (Subiaco, WAFL)
Rookie elevation
 Ethan Hughes
Pre-season draft

Rookie draft
16: Matt Uebergang (Redland, NEAFL)
34: Ryan Nyhuis (Nightcliff, NTFL)
50: Anthony Morabito (redrafted)
60: Josh Deluca (redrafted)

Retired
Colin Sylvia
Luke McPharlin
Paul Duffield
Delisted
Jacob Ballard
Ryan Crowley
Josh Deluca (redrafted in the rookie draft)
Max Duffy
Craig Moller
Anthony Morabito (redrafted in the rookie draft)
Tom Vandeleur
Uncontracted players/Free agents lost
None
Traded away
 Picks #16, #56 & 2016 2nd Round

2016/17 off season

Traded to Fremantle
 Cam McCarthy with picks #7, #35 & #73 for pick #3
 Bradley Hill for pick #23
Joel Hamling with picks #40 & #63 for picks #35, #43 & #61
Shane Kersten for pick #63

2016 National draft
8: Griffin Logue
38: Sean Darcy (Geelong Falcons)
41: Brennan Cox
66: Luke Ryan

Rookie draft
3: Taylin Duman (Oakleigh Chargers)
21: Luke Strnadica
38: Brady Grey (Redrafted)
50: Josh Deluca (Redrafted)

Retired
Matthew Pavlich
Delisted
Sean Hurley
Tanner Smith
Anthony Morabito
Matt de Boer
Jack Hannath
Clancee Pearce
Tendai Mzungu
Brady Grey (redrafted in the rookie draft)
Josh Deluca (redrafted in the rookie draft)
Michael Barlow
Alex Silvagni

Uncontracted players/Free agents lost
 Chris Mayne (to ), compensation: pick #23 
Traded away
Pick #3 for McCarthy, picks #7, #35 & #73

Pick swap
Sent pick #73 and a 2017 second-round pick to Gold Coast, received picks #35, #71 and a 2017 fourth-round selection

2017/18 off season

Traded to Fremantle
Nathan Wilson (Greater Western Sydney) and pick #71 for picks #57 and 2018 2nd round
Brandon Matera (Gold Coast) for 2018 3rd round pick

2017 National draft
2: Andrew Brayshaw (Sandringham Dragons)
5: Adam Cerra (Eastern Ranges)
44: Hugh Dixon (Kingborough Tigers)
59: Mitch Crowden (Sturt)
65: Tom North (Eastern Ranges)
69: Lloyd Meek (Greater Western Victoria Rebels)
73: Sam Switkowski (Box Hill Hawks)
75: Scott Jones (East Perth)
	
Rookie elevation
 Brady Grey

Rookie draft
5: Bailey Banfield (Claremont)
21: Stefan Giro (Norwood)

Delisted
Zac Clarke
Sam Collins
Josh Deluca
Jonathon Griffin
Matt Uebergang
Nick Suban
Retired
Shane Yarran
Garrick Ibbotson
Zac Dawson
Traded away
Lachie Weller  (to Gold Coast) with pick #41, for pick #2
Hayden Crozier  (to Western Bulldogs) with 2018 4th round pick, for picks #40 and #82
Harley Balic (to Melbourne) for pick #66

2018/19 off season

Free agent recruits
Reece Conca (Richmond)

Traded to Fremantle
Jesse Hogan (Melbourne)
Rory Lobb (Greater Western Sydney)
Travis Colyer (Essendon)

2018 National draft
17: Sam Sturt (Dandenong Stingrays, TAC Cup)
32: Luke Valente (SANFL)
57: Lachie Schultz (Williamstown, VFL)
59: Brett Bewley (Williamstown, VFL)

Rookie elevation
 Taylin Duman
 Bailey Banfield

Rookie draft
5: Ethan Hughes (redrafted)
22: Tobe Watson (Swan Districts, WAFL)
37: Ryan Nyhuis (redrafted)
Category B rookie nomination
 Jason Carter (Next Generation Academy, Kimberley)

Delisted
Cameron Sutcliffe
Tom Sheridan
Brady Grey
Luke Strnadica
Ethan Hughes (redrafted)
Ryan Nyhuis (redrafted)

Retired
Danyle Pearce
Michael Johnson
Lee Spurr
Michael Apeness

Traded away
Lachie Neale (to Brisbane Lions)

2019/20 off season

Traded to Fremantle
Blake Acres (St Kilda)
James Aish (Collingwood)

2019 National draft
7: Hayden Young (Dandenong Stingrays, NAB League)
8: Caleb Serong (Gippsland Power, NAB League)
9: Liam Henry (Next Generation Academy, Derby, Claremont, WAFL)
61: Michael Frederick (Woodville-West Torrens, SANFL)

Rookie elevation
 Stefan Giro
Rookie draft
6:Jarvis Pina (Peel Thunder, WAFL)
20:Tom North (redrafted)
30:Hugh Dixon (redrafted)
Category B rookie nomination
Isaiah Butters (Next Generation Academy, Halls Creek, Claremont, WAFL)
Leno Thomas (Next Generation Academy, Warmun, Claremont, WAFL)

Delisted
Harley Bennell
Scott Jones
Shane Kersten
Ryan Nyhuis
Tom North (redrafted)
Hugh Dixon (redrafted)

Retired
Hayden Ballantyne
Aaron Sandilands

Traded away
Bradley Hill  (to St Kilda)
Ed Langdon (to Melbourne)

2020/21 off season

Traded to Fremantle
None
2020 National draft
14: Heath Chapman
27: Nathan O'Driscoll
50: Brandon Walker
54: Joel Western

Rookie elevation
None
Moved to rookie list
Lachie Schultz
Brett Bewley

Rookie draft
7: Josh Treacy (Bendigo Pioneers)
18: Bailey Banfield (redrafted)

Category B rookie nomination
None

Delisted
Brandon Matera
Cam McCarthy
Hugh Dixon (rookie)
Tom North (rookie)
Dillon O'Reilly (rookie)
Jarvis Pina (rookie)
Isaiah Butters (category B rookie)
Jason Carter (category B rookie)
Bailey Banfield (to be redrafted)
Retired
None
Traded away
Jesse Hogan (to Greater Western Sydney)

2021/22 off season

Traded to Fremantle
Will Brodie
Jordan Clark

2021 National draft
8: Jye Amiss
10: Neil Erasmus
21: Matthew Johnson
54: Roy Benning

Rookie elevation
 Ethan Hughes

Rookie draft
8:  Karl Worner (Oakleigh Chargers)
25: Mitch Crowden (redrafted)
34: Connor Blakely (redrafted)

Category B rookie nomination:
Ultan Kelm (Ireland, deferred to 2023 due to injury)

Delisted
Leno Thomas (category B rookie)
Reece Conca
Brett Bewley (rookie)
Taylin Duman
Stefan Giro
Tobe Watson (rookie)
Connor Blakely (to be redrafted)
Mitch Crowden (to be redrafted)

Retired
Stephen Hill
Luke Valente

Traded away
Adam Cerra

2022/23 off season

Traded to Fremantle
Josh Corbett
Luke Jackson
Jaeger O'Meara

2022 National draft
33: Hugh Davies
41: Tom Emmett
42: Max Knobel  (Gippsland Power)
57: Corey Wagner

Rookie elevation
 Lachie Schultz

Rookie draft
13: Liam Reidy

Category B rookie nomination
Josh Draper, Next Generation Academy selection (Indigenous)
Conrad Williams, Next Generation Academy selection (Indigenous)

Delisted
Connor Blakely 
Joel Western
Mitch Crowden

Retired
David Mundy

Traded away
Blake Acres
Griffin Logue
Darcy Tucker
Rory Lobb
Lloyd Meek

See also
List of Fremantle Football Club players

Notes

References
 
 
 
 
 

Drafting and Trading History
Australian Football League draft